is a passenger railway station in the city of Numata, Gunma, Japan, operated by the East Japan Railway Company (JR East).

Lines

Station layout
The station has a single side platform and a single island platform, serving three tracks. The island platform (platforms 2 and 3) is connected to the station building by a footbridge. The station has a Midori no Madoguchi ticket office.

Platforms

History
Numata Station opened on 31 March 1924. Upon the privatization of the Japanese National Railways (JNR) on 1 April 1987, it came under the control of JR East.

Passenger statistics
In fiscal 2019, the station was used by an average of 1622 passengers daily (boarding passengers only).

Surrounding area

Numata City Hall
Numata Post Office
Site of Numata Castle

See also
 List of railway stations in Japan

References

External links

 Station information (JR East) 

Railway stations in Gunma Prefecture
Railway stations in Japan opened in 1924
Stations of East Japan Railway Company
Jōetsu Line
Numata, Gunma